Du is a Chinese surname. The name is spelled Tu in Taiwan, in Hong Kong it is translated as To, in Macao it is spelled as Tou, the pronunciation of 杜 in Cantonese. The Vietnamese equivalent of the surname is Đỗ. However, when diacritics are dropped, it can also be from the Vietnamese surnames Dư 余  or Dũ 俞 (Chinese equivalent is both Yu). It is the 129th surname in Hundred Family Surnames and is the 42nd most common surname in Mainland China as of 2020.

Origin and Branches of Du (杜)
The ancestors of the Du family are known as the Tangdu. The Tangdu resided southeast of Xi'an in Shaanxi province. The Fan (范) and Du clans share a common ancestor. Some members of the Du (杜) family are the Tuoba (拓跋) family of Emperor Xiaowen of Northern Wei. "Dugu" is the surname of Xianbei.

Meanings of Du (杜)
 The Chinese name of Pyrus betulifolia, a deciduous tree of the genus pear in the rosaceae.
 A verb: to stop; to prevent; to restrict

People with this name

Du
 Du Fu (杜甫) (712–770), Tang dynasty poet, considered one of China's greatest 
 Du Yu (杜預) (222–285), Jin dynasty classicist, wrote an influential commentary to the Zuozhuan
 Du Ji (杜畿) (d. 224), Cao Wei official, grandfather of Du Yu
 Du Mu  (杜牧) (803–852), Tang dynasty poet
 Lady Du Qiu (杜秋娘) (fl. 807–831), Tang dynasty poet
 Du Ruhui (杜如晦) (585–630), Tang dynasty chancellor
 Du Yan (杜淹) (d. 628), Tang dynasty chancellor, uncle of Du Ruhui
 Du Fuwei (杜伏威) (d. 624), Sui dynasty military leader
 Du Wei (杜伟) (1968–2020), Chinese diplomat
 Soon Ja Du, Korean-American shopkeeper convicted in the killing of Latasha Harlins

Duh, Taw, To, Toh, Tu
 Woody Duh (杜紫軍), Vice Premier of the Republic of China (2016)
 Taw Sein Ko (杜成誥/杜成浩), Burma's first archaeologist
 Alex To (杜德偉/杜德伟), a singer from Hong Kong
 Johnnie To (杜琪峯/杜琪峰), a film director from Hong Kong
 Chapman To, an actor from Hong Kong
 Tu Cheng-sheng, Taiwanese politician
 Toh Chin Chye, (杜进才; 1921–2012), a prominent first generation political leader in Singapore
 Toh Aik Choon (1927–1990), Singaporean shipbuilding industry businessman 
 Sylvia Toh (born 1946/1947), Singaporean newspaper columnist
 Toh Wei Soong (杜维崧; born 1998), Singaporean swimmer
 Toh Ee Wei (born 2000), Malaysian badminton player

都
It was found to be the 330th most common surname, shared by 140,060 people or 0.011% of the population, with the province with the most being Shandong.
Du Mu (Ming dynasty), (Chinese: 都穆; 1459–1525) was a Chinese poet, scholar and art critic from Suzhou
 Ray Du English (Chinese: 阿滴英文) is a Taiwanese educational YouTube channel hosted by 2 siblings, one of whom is internet personality Ray Du (都省瑞)

See also
 Đỗ

References

External links 
Origin of the surname Du, Tu, Do

Chinese-language surnames
Individual Chinese surnames